Pagliarulo is an Italian surname. Notable people with the surname include:

Emil Pagliarulo, American video game designer
Joe Pagliarulo (born 1966), American television and radio personality
Luca Pagliarulo (born 1983), Italian footballer
Mike Pagliarulo (born 1960), American baseball player

Italian-language surnames